Castnia invaria is a moth in the family Castniidae. It is found in South America.

The length of the forewings is 62–80 mm. Adults are greyish brown with a blue-green hue. There are two parallel whitish bands on the hindwings that extend from the costal margin toward the inner angle (lower band) and the anal margin (upper band). A third, shorter and thinner, apical band extends from the costal margin to the inner angle. The hindwings are reddish with a greyish-brown base and two black or dark brown bands that form two bands of red spots.

The larvae feed on Ananas species (including Ananas comosus) and wild terrestrial Bromeliaceae species. The larvae form large tunnels in the centre of pineapple plants and at sometimes also feed on the flowers or young fruits.

Subspecies
Castnia invaria invaria (Brazil: Rio de Janeiro)
Castnia invaria penelope Schaufuss, 1870 (Amazon basin, Orinoco Basin, from Venezuela and the Guianas to Paraguay, Chile and Argentina)
Castnia invaria trinitatis Lathy, 1925 (Trinidad)
Castnia invaria volitans Lamas, 1995 (Surinam, Venezuela, eastern Colombia)

References

Moths described in 1854
Castniidae